Traskorchestia traskiana, the Pacific beach hopper, is a species of beach hopper in the family Talitridae.

References

Amphipoda
Articles created by Qbugbot
Crustaceans described in 1857